

Winners and nominees

1990s

2000s

2010s

2020s

Records  
 Most awarded singers: Manuel Mijares, Alejandro Sanz and Pablo Alborán, 2 times.
 Singer that won all nominations: Alejandro Sanz and Pablo Alborán, 2 times.
 Most nominated singer: Marco Antonio Solís with 4 nominations.
 Most nominated singers without a win: Laura Pausini and María José with 2 nominations.
 Singer winning after short time: Pablo Alborán by (Tres veces Ana, 2017) and (Caer en tentación, 2018), 2 consecutive years.
 Singer winning after long time: Manuel Mijares by (Corazón salvaje, 1994) and (El Privilegio de Amar, 1999), 5 years difference.
Foreign winning singers:
 Ricardo Montaner from Argentina
 Enrique Iglesias from Spain
 Juan Luis Guerra from Dominican Republic
 Alejandro Sanz from Spain
 Axel from Argentina
 Pablo Alborán from Spain

References

External links 
TVyNovelas at esmas.com
TVyNovelas Awards at the univision.com

Musical Theme
Musical Theme
Musical Theme